It was in 2005 when Patrice Roberts shocked the entertainment industry in Trinidad and Tobago with her talent. Her introduction through a vocal collaboration was with Bunji Garlin who at that
time was in the spotlight. It was her refreshingly soothing and powerful vocals that quickly got her the attention that many established entertainers desired. Very few were able to provide accurate answers about her and her career, appearing mystery-like. Patrice Roberts has assumed her position in the Caribbean music industry as a force to be reckoned with.

In 2006, shortly after Patrice shot into the spotlight she became one of the frontline vocalists and the only female vocalists in the internationally recognized Soca Band, which at that time was known as Xtatik. For Patrice her professional career had just begun and she was in full flight. It would be a challenging and difficult journey for Patrice but one that she would embrace and make her own when given the opportunity. Patrice went on to be named the youngest female Road March winner for her collaboration with Machel Montano titled “Band Of The Year”. This achievement would solidify her existence in the Soca world and prove to critics that she was more talent than they expected.

Her talent has provided her with opportunities to travel extensively throughout the Caribbean,The USA and Europe with more opportunities still presenting themselves.

History
Patrice Roberts grew up in the fishing village of Toco, Trinidad. She attended Toco AC School (Primary School) and Toco Composite Secondary School. Her singing career began at the age of eight. She has also played the tenor steelpan.

Achievements 

In her early career, Roberts first won the 1995 Sangre Grande Junior Calypso Monarch competition. In 2000, she became a top finalist in the competition, marking her ascent in the calypso arena. In the year 2001, she became the National Soca Monarch, the National Library Calypso Monarch and the National Junior Calypso Monarch. She again won the National Junior Calypso Monarch in 2002. Other achievements include Toco Personality Winner 2000 and U.N.D.P. second-runner up 2001.

Patrice Roberts has also competed in the International Soca Monarch in Trinidad on several occasions. In 2006, she placed second alongside Zan with the track "Always Be" in the "Groovy" category. Her collaboration with Machel Montano, "Light it Up" placed 4th in the "Power" category in 2007. In 2008, she placed second in the "Groovy" category with her song "More Wuk".

Her greatest achievement so far has been winning the 2006 Road March competition with the song "Band of the Year" sung with Machel Montano.

Discography 
Blossoming (2003)
Looking Hot (2008)

Collaborations 
 "The Islands" (featuring Bunji Garlin) (2005)
 "Always Be" (featuring Zan) (2006)
 "Band of De Year" (featuring Machel Montano; album B.O.D.Y.) (2006)  (Winner 2006 Carnival Road March)
 "Till Tomorrow" (featuring Zan) (2007)
 "Light it Up" (featuring Machel Montano; album Book of Angels) (2007)
 "Dance With Me" (featuring Fraud Squad) (2007)
 "Wukkin Up (Remix)" (featuring Macka Diamond) (2007)
 "Rollin" (featuring Machel Montano; album Flame on) (2008)
 "Tempa Wine" (featuring Machel Montano) (2008)
 "Feels Nice" (featuring Machel Montano) (2008)
 "Bump & Grind" (featuring Tian Winter) (2008)
 "Soca Wedding" (featuring Zan) (2014)
 "Criminal Wine" (featuring Lyrikal and Millbeatz) (2017)
 "Ready" (featuring Charly Black) (2018)
 "My Side" (featuring Sekon Sta) (2018)
 "Closer" (featuring V’ghn) (2019)
 "Wha Ya Know" (featuring Lord Nelson) (2019)
 "Splash" (featuring Nessa Preppy and Travis World) (2020)
 "Start Up" (featuring Kemar Highcon Jonny Blaze and Stadic) (2020)
 "Toxic Love" (featuring Ricardo Drue) (2021)
 "Camera" (featuring Afro B Jonny Blaze and Stadic) (2021)
"Ammunition"(featuring Dexta Daps)> (2021)
 "Mind My Business" (featuring Travis World and Dan Evens) (2022)
 "Likkle Miss" - The Fine 9 (2022)

References

External links
www.patriceroberts.com Bio, Music, Video & Bookings

1986 births
Living people
21st-century Trinidad and Tobago women singers
21st-century Trinidad and Tobago singers
Soca musicians